Johnson Kwaku Djeckley Appiah was a Ghanaian diplomat who served as head of Ghana's mission to the United States of America. He served as Ghana's Charge de Affair to the United States of America from 2 July 1972 to 18 July 1972. Prior to this appointment, he was Ghana's High Commissioner to Kenya from 1969 to 1970, and the first Secretary to the Ghana permanent mission to the United States of America from 1962 to 1964.

References 

Ghanaian diplomats